Love and Rockets may refer to:

 Love and Rockets (comics), a comic book series by Jaime and Gilbert Hernandez
 Love and Rockets (band), an alternative rock band formed by members of Bauhaus, named after the comic
 Love and Rockets (album), a 1989 album by the band Love and Rockets
 Love & Rockets Vol. 1: The Transformation, a 2011 album by Murs and Ski Beatz
 "Love and Rockets (Hell's Screaming)", a bonus track from the King's X album XV

See also
 "Love and Rocket", a 2002 episode of Futurama